Cryptolepas is a genus of whale barnacles in the family Coronulidae. There are two described species in Cryptolepas, one of which is extinct.

Species
These species belong to the genus Cryptolepas:
 Cryptolepas rhachianecti Dall, 1872
 † Cryptolepas murata Zullo, 1961

References

Barnacles